Geno is a masculine given name, usually of Italian origin. It is occasionally a short form of Eugene and other names. People named Geno include:

Geno Adamia (1936–1993), Georgian military commander
Geno Arce (born 1964), bassist
Geno Atkins (born 1988), American football player
Geno Auriemma (born 1954), Italian-born American women's basketball coach
Geno Baroni (1930–1984), Roman Catholic priest and social activist
Geno Carlisle (born 1976), American former professional basketball player
Geno Delafose (born 1972),  American accordionist and singer
Geno DeMarco, American football coach and player
Geno DeNobile (1933–1995), Canadian footballer
Geno Dobrevski (born 1970), former Bulgarian footballer
Geno Espineli (born 1982), baseball relief pitcher
Geno Ford (born 1974), basketball coach
Geno Hayes (1987–2021), American football linebacker
Geno Jones (born 1992), sprinter
Geno Lenardo, former guitarist for the band Filter
Geno Lewis (born 1993), Canadian football wide receiver
Geno Mateev (1903–1966), Bulgarian footballer
Geno Morosi (1920–2016), serviceman
Geno Petralli (born 1959), American former professional baseball player
Geno Petriashvili (born 1994), heavyweight freestyle wrestler
Geno Segers (born 1978), American actor
Geno Silva (1948–2020), American actor
Geno Smith (born 1990), American football player
Geno Stone (born 1999), American football player
Geno Washington (born 1943), American R&B singer
Geno White (born 1978)

See also
Geno (disambiguation)
Gino (disambiguation)

Masculine given names
Hypocorisms